"Cadillac Ranch" is a song written by Chuck Jones and Chris Waters, and recorded by American country music artist Chris LeDoux. It was released in October 1992 as the second and final single from his album Whatcha Gonna Do with a Cowboy. The song reached number 18 on the Billboard Hot Country Singles & Tracks chart and number 16 on the Canadian RPM Country Tracks.

Content
"Cadillac Ranch" is an uptempo song, in which the narrator discusses turning their farm into a party nightspot because of their financial issues.

Critical reception
Deborah Evans Price, of Billboard magazine reviewed the song favorably, calling it a "rock'n'roll-ish tale about converting a failing farm into a thriving nightspot."

Music video
The music video was directed by Michael Merriman and premiered in October 1992.

Chart performance
"Cadillac Ranch" debuted at number 52 on the U.S. Billboard Hot Country Singles & Tracks for the week of November 7, 1992.

References

1992 songs
1992 singles
Chris LeDoux songs
Songs written by Chuck Jones (songwriter)
Songs written by Chris Waters
Song recordings produced by Jimmy Bowen
Song recordings produced by Jerry Crutchfield
Liberty Records singles